Premija (English:Premium) is a duet song recorded by Montenegrin singer Dado Polumenta featuring Serbian recording artist Nikolija. It was in Polumenta’s recognizable pop-folk style, but it was different than Nikolija’s previous work. Toxic entertainment did the music video, in which Dado and Nikolija are shown as con-artists in a casino. Dado works as a security guard and Nikolija is gambling on the roulette wheel.

Vesna Zmijanac, Nikolija’s mather and Polumenta’s friend, brought them together. The song wasn’t planned, but it was done relatively quickly. Because the New Year was near, they said that the song is a present for their fans.

References 

Serbian songs
2014 songs
Pop-folk songs